Carlos Fabián Leeb (born 18 July 1968, in  Buenos Aires) is an Argentine former football striker and a current manager. He is the son of Luis Félix Leeb, a professional footballer who played over 300 games in Argentine football.

Playing career
Leeb started his career with Club Atlético Independiente in the First Division in 1987. In 1991, he had a short spell with Estudiantes de La Plata before signing for Chacarita Juniors in the 3rd division in 1992.

In 1994 Chacarita were promoted to the Second Division. Leeb became an idol at the club, scoring 64 goals in 126 games.

In 1997 Leeb transferred to fellow Second Division Club Atlético Banfield. In 2001 Banfield were promoted to the First Division, Leeb played a single season with Banfield in the top flight before moving to Ferro Carril Oeste in the Third Division where he retired from playing in 2002.

During his playing career, he suffered from a lot of injuries and underwent 14 operations.

Coaching career
In 2005 Carlos Leeb started coaching Banfield first Team. He enjoyed a lot of success and in 2006 joined Club Guaraní in Paraguay making a two-year campaign with very good records. In June 2009 he took over Universitario of Bolivia, with the objectives of entering an international competition. He accomplished his objective by entering the Copa Sudamericana in 2010. He left Universario due to club's debt to player's and coaching staff.  He works as the manager for Nacional Potosi of the Liga de Fútbol Profesional Boliviano since 09.08.2012.

External links
 Argentine Primera statistics
 Soy de Banfield profile

1968 births
Living people
Argentine footballers
Argentine football managers
Association football forwards
Club Atlético Independiente footballers
Estudiantes de La Plata footballers
Chacarita Juniors footballers
Club Atlético Banfield footballers
Ferro Carril Oeste footballers
Footballers from Buenos Aires
Chacarita Juniors managers
Sport Boys Warnes managers
Club Guaraní managers
Nacional Potosí managers
Ayacucho FC managers
Libertad Gran Mamoré F.C. managers
Universitario de Sucre managers